Morganza is an incorporated village near the Mississippi River in Pointe Coupee Parish, Louisiana, United States. The population was 610 at the 2010 census, down from 659 in 2000. It is part of the Baton Rouge Metropolitan Statistical Area. The village's zip code is 70759. The Morganza Spillway, a flood control structure between the Mississippi River and the Atchafalaya Basin, is located nearby.

History

Morganza takes its name from Morganza Plantation, the antebellum holding of Charles Morgan, an early surveyor, political figure and first American sheriff of Pointe Coupee Parish. Morgan, the son of James Morgan from a town of the family's name in Sayreville, New Jersey, and a captain in the Second Regiment of the Middlesex County (N.J.) militia during the Revolutionary War. Evidence indicates he was involved in the transfer of slaves from New Jersey to Louisiana in conflict with New Jersey law. The U.S. Post Office opened in 1847, closed some years later, and reopened in 1899.  Members of the Campbell family held the position of postmaster until 1970. The town was not incorporated until 1908.

Morganza was the site of a Union Army encampment during the American Civil War. The largest battle in Pointe Coupee Parish was fought at nearby Stirling Plantation, on September 29, 1863. Sixteen Federal troops were killed, 45 were wounded, and 462 were taken prisoner.  The Confederate losses included 26 dead, 85 wounded, and 10 missing.  Although the Battle of Sterling Plantation was a Confederate victory, the Union troops burned the town of Morganza to the ground on October 1, 1863.

Historian John D. Winters in The Civil War in Louisiana (1963) documents the arrival in May 1864 of Federal troops in Morganza under General Nathaniel P. Banks, recently defeated in the Battle of Mansfield in DeSoto Parish and abandoning the Red River Campaign. According to Winters, conditions were miserable, with extreme heat, excessive rainfall, and epidemics of various illnesses.

To commemorate the centennial anniversary of the Village of Morganza, U.S. Congressman Rodney Alexander entered a speech about the village into the Congressional Record on December 10, 2008.

Periodic flooding
Located at the lower end of a sharp bend of the Mississippi River, Morganza has been subjected to flooding by the great river a number of times. Levee breaches or "crevasses" occurred at Morganza and Grand Levee just downriver in 1850, 1865, 1867, and 1890. The Morganza Spillway, a major flood diversion project of the U.S. Army Corps of Engineers, is located immediately north of the town. Construction on this mammoth work began in 1939 and was completed in 1955. High water of the Mississippi is channeled between guide levees north and west of the town of Morganza and down into the Atchafalaya Basin, thence to the Gulf of Mexico. The floodgates of this facility have been used only twice—during the high water of 1973 and 2011. The structure will be used again in the summer of 2019.

Geography
Morganza is located at  (30.735681, -91.593390).

Climate
Climate is characterized by relatively high temperatures and evenly distributed precipitation throughout the year.  The coldest month is usually quite mild, although frosts are not uncommon, and winter precipitation is derived primarily from frontal cyclones along the polar front.  The Köppen Climate Classification subtype for this climate is "Cfa". (Humid Subtropical Climate).

Demographics

As of the census of 2000, there were 659 people, 264 households, and 191 families residing in the village. The racial makeup of the village was 72.99% White, 26.40% African American, and 0.61% from two or more races. Hispanic or Latino of any race were 0.91% of the population.

There were 264 households, out of which 31.8% had children under the age of 18 living with them, 53.8% were married couples living together, 13.6% had a female householder with no husband present, and 27.3% were non-families. 23.9% of all households were made up of individuals, and 14.0% had someone living alone who was 65 years of age or older. The average household size was 2.50 and the average family size was 2.98.

In the village, the population was spread out, with 23.8% under the age of 18, 8.0% from 18 to 24, 23.4% from 25 to 44, 25.3% from 45 to 64, and 19.4% who were 65 years of age or older. The median age was 41 years. For every 100 females, there were 95.5 males. For every 100 females age 18 and over, there were 88.0 males.

The median income for a household in the village was $28,750, and the median income for a family was $36,563. Males had a median income of $34,375 versus $26,964 for females. The per capita income for the village was $13,901. About 18.2% of families and 22.6% of the population were below the poverty line, including 33.7% of those under age 18 and 15.2% of those age 65 or over.

Government
The Village of Morganza is a municipality led by an elected Mayor along with three Council members. Clarence "Woots" Wells took office as Mayor in January of 2019. His Council consists of Salvadore Tuminello, Julie Langlois, and Cathy Plauche. The Mayor and Council hold a public meeting at the town hall on the first Tuesday of every month.

The head of this agency is an appointed official, with the position currently held by Chief of Police Mark Ramagos. The department's main office is located at 112 LA Highway 3050. Its main area of responsibility is law enforcement and community service within the corporate limits of the Village of Morganza, although its officers are occasionally tasked to assist other area police agencies such as the Pointe Coupee Parish Sheriff's Office, the Louisiana State Police, and Louisiana Wildlife & Fisheries. The Morganza Police Department has a strong traffic enforcement presence along Louisiana Highway 1 and Louisiana Highway 10.

Media
The town features in the 1969 film Easy Rider, where the main characters are subjected to ridicule from townsfolk in a local restaurant.  Several scenes in the movie were filmed on location in Morganza.  The old restaurant building was demolished in 2016, but is commemorated with a plaque in the sidewalk.

Notable person
 John B. Fournet, Louisiana politician and judge

See also

Morganza High School

References

External links

 Morganza Interactive Map

Villages in Pointe Coupee Parish, Louisiana
Villages in Louisiana
Baton Rouge metropolitan area
Municipal police departments of Louisiana